This is a list of electoral division results for the Australian 1996 federal election in the state of Tasmania.

Overall results

Results by division

Bass

Braddon

Denison

Franklin

Lyons

See also 

 Members of the Australian House of Representatives, 1996–1998

References 

Tasmania 1996